The Nun's Story is a 1956 novel by Kathryn Hulme. It was a Book of the Month selection and reached #1 on The New York Times Best Seller list.

Hulme wrote the book based partly upon the experiences of her friend, Marie Louise Habets of the Sisters of Charity of Jesus and Mary, a Belgian nurse and an ex-nun whom she met while working with refugees in post-war Europe. The author sponsored the former nun's immigration to the United States, and later converted to Catholicism. It often is stated erroneously that the book was based upon Hulme's experiences.

The lead character of the book, Sister Luke (pre-convent name Gabrielle Van Der Mal), finds her faith tested in Africa where she finds herself at odds with headstrong Dr. Fortunati, operator of a remote hospital in the Belgian Congo, with whom she gradually builds respect, and again during World War II, when she is ordered not to take sides. Ultimately, Sister Luke is forced to decide whether to remain in the convent or return to the outside world.
  
Gabrielle/Sister Luke is stretched between her desire to be faithful to the rule of her congregation and her desire to be a nurse. As a nun, she must remove all vestiges of "Gabrielle Van Der Mal" and sublimate herself into the devoted bride of Christ. As a nun, there is no room for her personal desires and aspirations. Ultimately, the conflict between her devotion to the Church and the nursing profession, juxtaposed with her passionate Belgian patriotism and her love of her father (killed by Nazi fighter planes while treating wounded) bring her to an impasse, which serves as the dénouement of the novel.

Film, TV or theatrical adaptations
In 1959, The Nun's Story was adapted by screenwriter Robert Anderson and director Fred Zinnemann. The Nun's Story starred Audrey Hepburn as Sister Luke. It was a critical and box-office success, and Hepburn was nominated for an Academy Award for the third time.

Hepburn met Marie-Louise Habets while preparing for the role, and Habets later helped nurse Hepburn back to health following her near-fatal horse-riding accident on the set of the 1960 film The Unforgiven.

The relationship among Hulme, Habets and Hepburn is explored in Zoe Fairbairns' radio play The Belgian Nurse, first broadcast on BBC Radio Four in January 2007.

References

1956 American novels
American novels adapted into films
Novels set in Belgian Congo
Nuns in fiction
Little, Brown and Company books